CC Attle's (or sometimes simply CC's) is a gay bar in Seattle's Capitol Hill neighborhood, in the U.S. state of Washington.

Description and history

CC Attle's is a popular gay bar on East Olive Way in Seattle's Capitol Hill neighborhood. The bar is owned by Chris Daw, as of 2021.

Joshua McNichols of KUOW has said CC Attle's is known for "stiff drinks and leather nights". Lonely Planet says, "LGBTIQ+ travelers who prefer catching up over a plate of nachos to blasting EDM will want to post up at this congenial pub. It's known as a bar for bears (slang for stockier, hairier gay men) and their admirers, but anyone looking for a laid-back time will feel welcome. You can also expect friendly bartenders who make strong drinks. Best of all: no cover ever."

Moon Seattle says, "It's a chill scene at C.C. Attle's, a bear bar with pool tables and more sunlight than many other drinking holes on Capitol Hill. The smoking corner outside is very social, and during Pride the crowd spills out into the streets. The rest of the time it's quiet enough for conversation, and there's never a cover."

Reception
Emma Banks included CC Attle's in Thrillist's 2021 list of "The Best LGBTQ Bars in Seattle", writing: "Strong drinks, good food, and frequent open mic nights characterize C C Attle's, a longstanding hangout for Seattle's gay community. Here, proof of vaccination is strictly enforced, and the vibe is decidedly chill, so don't expect a rager. Rather, this is the spot to sit back, relax, and take a load off."

References

External links

 
 CC Attle's at Zomato

Bear (gay culture)
Capitol Hill, Seattle
Leather subculture
LGBT culture in Seattle
LGBT drinking establishments in Washington (state)